Spider-Man (Pavitr Prabhakar) is a superhero appearing in American comic books published by Marvel Comics. He is an alternate version of Spider-Man who lives in India.

The character will make his cinematic debut in the 2023 feature film Spider-Man: Across the Spider-Verse voiced by Karan Soni, depicted as a member of Miguel O'Hara's Spider-Forces.

Publishing history
Pavitr Prabhakar first appeared in Spider-Man: India #1 (January 2005).

Fictional character biography
Pavitr Prabhakar, a simple Indian boy from a remote village, moves to Mumbai with his Aunt Maya and Uncle Bhim to study after getting half a scholarship. His parents died some years ago. Other students at his new school tease him and beat him for his studious nature and simple background. He knows his Uncle Bhim is struggling to support him and his aunt Maya, and pay his school fees. Only Meera Jain, a popular girl from his school, befriends him.

Meanwhile, a local crime lord named Nalin Oberoi uses an amulet to perform an ancient ritual in which he is possessed by a demon committed to opening a gate for other demons to invade Earth. While being chased by bullies, Pavitr Prabhakar encounters an ancient yogi who grants him the powers of a spider to fight the evil that threatens the world. While discovering his powers, Pavitr Prabhakar refuses to help a woman being attacked by several men. He leaves the place, but comes back when he hears his uncle cry out, and discovers that he has been slain. He learns that Bhim was stabbed when he tried to help the woman. Pavitr Prabhakar understands that with great power comes great responsibility, and swears to use his powers for the good of others.

Nalin Oberoi briefly becomes human again and transforms a mild-mannered doctor into a demon with four magical tentacles (the Indian version of Doctor Octopus) and sends him to kill Spider-Man, as instructed by the demon voices. "Doc Ock" fails, and Spider-Man makes his public debut as a hero. The newspapers, however, label him as a threat.

Oberoi kidnaps Pavitr Prabhakar's aunt, taking her to a refinery outside Mumbai. There he betrays Doctor Octopus, blasting him into the ocean. Spider-Man arrives and fights Oberoi, who has also kidnapped Meera. He drops both Maya and Meera from the top of the refinery. Spider-Man dives for his aunt, but fails to rescue Meera, who is saved by Doctor Octopus. Pavitr reveals his identity to Meera and asks her to take his aunt to safety.

Oberoi gets rid of Doctor Octopus for good and touches Spider-Man with the amulet. A Venom-like creature emerges from the amulet and tries to lure Spider-Man to the dark side. Pavitr remembers his uncle's saying about responsibility and rejects the evil, shattering the link between the demons and Oberoi and making Oberoi human again. Spider-Man throws the amulet into the ocean and Oberoi is sent to a mental institution.

Peace is restored to Mumbai eventually. Pavitr Prabhakar begins a romance with Meera, and is shown celebrating the festival Diwali with his aunt. The story ends with a quote from the Bhagavad Gita, showing the Venom-Demon still alive.

Spider-Verse
During the Spider-Verse storyline, which featured Spider-Men from various alternate realities, Pavitr Prabhakar was seen fighting a mysterious new villain named Karn, whom he mistook for a demon. The Superior Spider-Man (Doctor Octopus' mind in Peter Parker's body) managed to save him and recruited him into his army of Spiders. In the second volume of Spider-Verse set during the Secret Wars event, Pavitr Prabhakar found himself in the domain of the Battleworld called Arachnia, where he teamed up with Spider-Gwen, Spider-Ham, Spider-Man Noir, Spider-UK, and Anya Corazon, though none of them remembered their previous encounter during the original Spider-Verse.

Following the conclusion of Secret Wars the team of six Spiders that formed during the event will rename itself and feature in a new ongoing series called Web Warriors, a name coined by Peter Parker from the Ultimate Spider-Man TV series during the original Spider-Verse.

Spider-Geddon
During the "Spider-Geddon" storyline, Pavitr has been keeping surveillance on Earth-3145 with the help of Spider-Girl, Spider-Punk, Spider-UK, and Master Weaver. They find that the Inheritors have become malnourished since they were last seen.

In other media
 Pavitr Prabhakar will appear in the upcoming film Spider-Man: Across the Spider-Verse, voiced by Karan Soni, as a member of Miguel O'Hara's Spider-Forces.
 Pavitr Prabhakar appears as an unlockable playable character in Spider-Man Unlimited.

Reception 
James Whitbrook of io9 placed Pavitr as number fourteen as the greatest alternate take of Spider-Man. Explaining that he "shares much in common with the general Spider-Man legacy, but he’s probably the best example of a foreign Spider-Man Marvel's ever attempted." Ryan Linch of Screen Rant placed Pavitr as number ten, opining that the character "has some really clever deviations from his American counterparts, but still retains everything that makes Spider-Man great."

References

Comics characters introduced in 2004
Fictional characters with precognition
Fictional characters with superhuman durability or invulnerability
Marvel Comics mutates
Marvel Comics superheroes
Marvel Comics characters with superhuman strength
Fictional Indian people
Alternative versions of Spider-Man
Indian superheroes
Spider-Man characters